Peter "Possum" Raymond George Bourne (13 April 1956 – 30 April 2003) was a champion New Zealand rally car driver. He died under non-competitive circumstances while driving on a public road that was to be the track for an upcoming race.

Awards 

He was a three-time winner of the Asia-Pacific Rally Championship and the Australian Rally Championship seven times consecutively, amongst many other titles. In 1993 he became the first New Zealand resident to have a works contract in a FISA rally championship, when he drove a Subaru Legacy for Prodrive.

Family 
Bourne lived in Pukekohe, Auckland, near his workshop.  He lived with his wife, Peggy Bourne, and three children, Taylor, Spencer, and Jazlin. Bourne earned his nickname, "Possum", on the night he crashed his mother's Humber 80 while trying to avoid a possum in the middle of the road.

His autobiography, Bourne to Rally, was completed just days before his death. A bronze memorial statue of Bourne, unveiled a year after his death, stood overlooking the place of his death. The statue was moved to Pukekohe town square in April 2013, unveiled alongside the 2013 ITM 400 V8 Championship parade. In 2005, Peggy Bourne entered Race to the Sky, despite having had no formal rally driving experience, as a tribute to her late husband. In 2013, his oldest son Taylor Bourne competed in the 2013 Possum Bourne Memorial Rally with his stepfather and MP Mark Mitchell as co-driver. When Taylor completed the event, he went on to say "It's easy to understand why he loved it so much".

Car of choice 
Bourne was best known for his exploits behind the wheel of Subaru cars, initially the RX (the turbocharged version of the Leone), then the Legacy (rebadged as the Liberty for the Australian market because of a perceived clash with charity organisation Legacy Australia).

But it would be the Impreza WRX that he would become most associated with, driving for the Subaru World Rally Team in Rally New Zealand, Australia and also in Indonesia, partnered by Richard Burns in the mid 1990s, before going on to win multiple Australian titles with Subaru Rally Team Australia.

Subaru Japan gave him a black, limited edition Subaru Impreza WRX STi for personal use.

Death of Rodger Freeth 

Bourne's best friend and co-driver, Dr. Rodger "Roj" Freeth, died in a horrible accident during 1993 Rally Australia, and the crash almost ended Bourne's career. After encouragement from the Freeth family, he returned to the driver's seat. After Freeth's death, Bourne displayed a "ROJ" license plate on the front of his rally cars.

Death 

Bourne received serious head injuries in a non-competitive car crash on 18 April 2003, and died in Dunedin Hospital on 30 April 2003 after life support was withdrawn. He was driving the Race to the Sky track, on the Waiorau Snow Farm Road which is normally a public road, for the event held in Cardrona, near Wānaka, New Zealand. Driving his Subaru Forester, he collided head on with a Jeep Cherokee driven by rally driver Mike Barltrop who claimed that Bourne was speeding. This treacherous road has over 100 corners and at least 15 hairpins, hence its appeal for rally driving. Barltrop was later arrested on a dangerous driving charge. After pleading guilty to aggravated careless use causing death, Barltrop was sentenced in the Invercargill District Court to 300 hours' community work, disqualified from driving for 18 months, and ordered to pay $10,000 reparations, divided between the intensive care unit of Dunedin Public Hospital and the Possum Bourne Education Trust.

At the time of his death, Bourne had just re-entered the world stage, driving a production-class Subaru Impreza in the PWRC.

Career results

References

External links
 Obituary – from The Age
 Obituary – AFP
 Possum Bourne Motorsport
 News story about who was to blame
 Interview with Barltrop
 Mike Barltrop arrested

1956 births
2003 deaths
New Zealand rally drivers
World Rally Championship drivers
Road incident deaths in New Zealand
Sportspeople from Auckland